Almendra may refer to:

Places
 Almendra, Salamanca, a village and municipality in the province of Salamanca, Spain
 Almendra, Portugal, a civil parish in the municipality of Vila Nova de Foz Côa, Portugal
 Almendra, Zamora, a village in the municipality of San Pedro de la Nave-Almendra, Spain
 Almendra Central, city centre of Madrid, Spain

Music
 Almendra (band), a rock band from Buenos Aires, Argentina
 Almendra (Almendra album), 1969
 Almendra (Aldemaro Romero album), 1957